Paul Gregory may refer to:
Paul Gregory (baseball) (1908–1999), Major League pitcher and college coach
Paul Gregory (lighting designer) (born 1952), president and founder of Focus Lighting
Paul Gregory (producer) (1920–2015), American film and theatre producer
Paul R. Gregory (born 1949),  English fantasy artist
Paul Roderick Gregory,  professor of economics, University of Houston, Texas
Paul Gregory (squash player) (born 1968), English squash player

See also
Paul Gregory Bootkoski (born 1940), bishop of the Roman Catholic Diocese of Metuchen
Paul Gregori (fl. 1990s), paralympic athlete from France 
Gregory Paul (disambiguation)